The 2016–17 Turkish Women's Volleyball League is the 34th edition of the top-flight professional women's volleyball league in Turkey.

Regular season

League table

Source: Turkish Volleyball Federation

Updated: 28 March 2017

Results

Play-outs

Play-offs
The eight teams that finished in the places 1 to 8 in the Regular season, compete in the Play-off (1-8).

Quarterfinals

Fifth place play-offs
Winners qualify for CEV Challenge Cup main phase.
2 matches were needed for win.

|-
|colspan=6 align="left"|Çanakkale Bld won by 2–1 matches

|-
| colspan=6 align="left"|Bursa BŞB won by 2–1 matches.

Semifinals
Winners qualify for CEV Champions League league round.

|-
| colspan=6 align="left"|Fenerbahçe won by golden set 16–14.

Seventh place matches

Fifth place matches

Third place matches
Winner qualify for CEV Champions League qualification round.
Loser qualify for CEV Cup main phase.

Final matches
3 matches were needed for win.

|-
| colspan=6 align="left"|Fenerbahçe won by 3–0 matches.

Final standing

Awards

Regular season

Best Setter
  Naz Aydemir (VakıfBank)
Best Outside Spikers
  Zhu Ting (Vakıfbank İstanbul)
  Mia Jerkov (Çanakkale Bld.)

Best Middle Blockers
  Milena Rašić (VakıfBank)
  Eda Erdem Dündar (Fenerbahçe)
Best Opposite Spiker
  Tijana Bošković (Eczacıbaşı VitrA)
Best Libero
  Nihan Güneyligil (Galatasaray Daikin)

Finals series

References

External links 
 2016–17 Vestel Venus Sultanlar Ligi 

Turkish Volleyball League
Turkish Volleyball League
2016 in Turkish sport
2017 in Turkish sport
Turkey
2016 in Turkish women's sport
2017 in Turkish women's sport
Turkish Women's Volleyball League seasons